Kemijoki, with its  length, is the longest river in Finland. It runs through Kemijärvi and Rovaniemi before reaching the Gulf of Bothnia at Kemi.

At Rovaniemi the Ounasjoki river merges with Kemijoki.

The first hydroelectric plant on Kemijoki was constructed in 1949 at Isohaara. A total of 15 power plants have been constructed so far. The plants are owned by Kemijoki Oy and Pohjolan Voima Oy. In 2003 the plants produced a total of 4.3 TWh, which was about 34.5% of Finland's total hydroelectric production.

See also 

 List of rivers of the Baltic Sea
 Rivers of Finland

References

External links 

Hydroelectric power stations in Finland
Tervola
Kemijoki basin
Rivers of Rovaniemi